Maria-Victoria Drăguș (born 1994) is a German-Romanian actress.  Her film credits include If Not Us, Who?, Draussen ist Sommer and Kill Me.  One notable role was in Palme d'Or-winning 2009 film The White Ribbon. She has had reoccurring roles in the television programs Dance Academy and Leipzig Homicide.  She has a younger sister Paraschiva, and is the niece of the French writer Viorel Dragus.

Selected filmography
 The White Ribbon (2009)
 24 Weeks (2016)
 Graduation (2016) 
 Tiger Girl (2017)
  (2017)
 Mary Queen of Scots (2018)
 Brecht (2019)

Awards
 2014 Shooting Stars Award at the Berlin International Film Festival

References

External links

 

1994 births
Living people
German film actresses
German people of Romanian descent